MV Langeland was a Norwegian cargo ship. It was owned and operated by the Norwegian company Myklebusthaug Management AS based in Fonnes, Austrheim. It sank on July 31, 2009 in stormy weather south of the Koster Islands; no one from its 6-men crew survived.

References

Maritime incidents in 2009
Merchant ships of Norway
Ships built in Norway
1971 ships